Helfert Nunatak is a prominent rock nunatak standing  west of Mount Sharp of the Sentinel Range, in the Ellsworth Mountains of Antarctica. It was discovered and visited by the Marie Byrd Land Traverse party, 1957–58, under Charles R. Bentley, and named for Norbert F. Helfert, a meteorologist at Byrd Station in 1957.

References

Nunataks of Ellsworth Land